Virgil Chester Livers Jr. (born March 26, 1952) is a former American football cornerback in the National Football League (NFL). He was drafted by the Chicago Bears in the fourth round of the 1975 NFL Draft. He played college football at Western Kentucky.

Livers is known for a testicle injury during his NFL career with the Chicago Bears, and there are a number of articles (as well as the film, Hot Tub Time Machine, though not by name) on football injuries and the importance of wearing cups that reference his injury, and some that go into excruciating detail.

Livers also played for the Chicago Blitz of the United States Football League (USFL) from 1983 to 1984 as a defensive back.  The team went 17–20 in those two years.

Livers was an assistant principal at Bowling Green High School from 1998 to 2017. In 2017, Livers was inducted into the Kentucky Pro Football Hall of Fame.

References

1952 births
Living people
American football cornerbacks
American football return specialists
Chicago Bears players
Chicago Blitz players
Western Kentucky Hilltoppers football players
People from Nelson County, Kentucky
Players of American football from Kentucky